MV Nasrin-1 was a ferry that sunk in the Meghna River near Chandpur, Bangladesh, on the midnight of July 8, 2003. Of the 750 people on board 220 were rescued.

References

Further reading
 
 
 
 
 
 

2003 disasters in Bangladesh
Ferries of Bangladesh
Maritime incidents in Bangladesh
Shipwrecks in rivers
Maritime incidents in 2003
2003 in Bangladesh